Gavrilo or Gabriel Rodić, Freiherr (Baron) von Rodich, (13 December 1812 – 21 May 1890) was an Austro-Hungarian general in the Imperial Austrian and Austro-Hungarian Army.

Biography
Rodić was born in Vrginmost, Habsburg Croatia, and raised as a devout Serbian Orthodox believer, but did not express a Serb nationality and instead devoted his life to service in the Austrian imperial army, like many others in their day.

He began his military career at the age of 14 when he was accepted into the cadet company at Graz. By 1847 he had achieved the rank of captain-lieutenant. The following year he was made a member of the Croatian ban Josip Jelačić's cabinet during the 1848 Revolutions. When the army of Croatia-Slavonia crossed the Drava to retake Međimurje, Rodić was appointed assistant to the ban's adjutant general. He later participated in fighting in Hungary. For his service during these years he received the title of Ritter in the Austrian court.

By 1859 Rodić was promoted to general-major. He was made brigade commander at Dubrovnik and later Kotor. He remained in Dalmatia until 1862. Afterwards he saw action against both Italian and Prussian forces. In the 1866 Austro-Prussian War, he was made an attached Feldmarschall-Lieutenant in the Army of the South (Südarmee) in Italy. He commanded the V Corps in the Battle of Custoza, and after this victory he was officially promoted to the rank of Feldmarschall-Lieutenant and awarded the Knight's Cross of the Military Order of Maria Theresia.

In 1869 he returned to Dalmatia as a military commander. He soon put down a rebellion in Kotor which helped him become governor of the Kingdom of Dalmatia in 1870. During his time as governor Rodić worked for the unification of Dalmatia with Croatia-Slavonia. During the Austro-Russian negotiations between the Treaty of San Stefano and the Treaty of Berlin he was proposed by Nikolai Pavlovich Ignatiev as the leader of an autonomous Macedonia within the Ottoman Empire. His forces took part in the occupation of Bosnia and Herzegovina in 1878.

He retired from this position and from military service in 1881 as a Feldzeugmeister. He returned to Vienna, where he died in 1890.

See also
 Petar Preradović
 Svetozar Borojević
 Paul Davidovich
 Arsenije Sečujac
 Paul von Radivojevich
 Peter Vitus von Quosdanovich
 Mathias Rukavina von Boynograd
 Maximilian Njegovan

References

External links
 Rodić at Austro-Hungarian Army, by Glenn Jewison & Jörg C. Steiner

1812 births
1890 deaths
Croatian Austro-Hungarians
Barons of Croatia
Croatian military personnel in Austrian armies
Austrian generals
Serbs of Croatia
Kingdom of Dalmatia
People of the Military Frontier
Austro-Hungarian Serbs
People of the Austro-Prussian War